The Butterfly Lovers is the second studio album by Hong Kong singer Hubert Wu. It was released on 2 October 2013 via Stars Shine International. The album was available for pre-order on 20 September 2012.

Track listing

Edition
CD+DVD

Music videos

Chart performance

Singles

Hong Kong

Other charts

References 

Hubert Wu albums
2013 albums